Joseph Manley may refer to:

 Joey Manley (1965–2013), American LGBT author
 Joseph Homan Manley (1842–1905), American Republican Party official
 Joe Manley (born 1959), American boxer